Literary Encyclopedia (Russian: Литературная энциклопедия) is a 12-volume encyclopedia published in the USSR from 1929 until 1939. It contains more than 5000 entries with a focus on Russian and Soviet authors, as well as literary schools, trends, directions, and literary concepts. The 10th volume was delayed by Soviet censors in 1937, rumored to be a result of concerns about the article "Russian literature" The series was halted in 1939 after the publication of the 11th volume. The 12 volume was published later based on drafts.

Volumes
 Volume 1: Abay - Byvalov (1930))
 Volume 2: Bylinas - Griboedov (1929)
 Volume 3: Grigorovich - Dyalsky (1930)
 Volume 4: The Gospel - Ishki (1930)
 Volume 5: Kaan - Kiichelbecker (1931)
 Volume 6: La Barth - (1932)
 Volume 7: Marly - German Literature (1934)
 Volume 8: German - Plutarch (1934)
 Volume 9: Pnin - Roman (1935)
 Volume 10: Romanov - "The Contemporary" (Journal of Nekrasov and II Panayeva) (1937)
 Volume 11: Stanzas - Forteguerri (1939)
 Volume 12: Fortunat - Iashvili (not completed)

Drafts and manuscripts of volumes 10 through 12 were preserved and have been used to construct the planned content. In 2005, ETS Publishing House released a CD-ROM which included some restored materials.

Editors and contributors

Managing Editor (Volume 1–6), Editor (Volumes 7–11):
V. M. Fritsche (Volumes 1–2)
A. V. Lunacharsky (Volumes 3–11)

Executive secretary (Volumes 1–5), Academic Secretary (Volumes 6–11):
O. Beskin (Volumes 1–5)
M. S. Gelfand (Volume 6)
E. N. Mikhailova (Volumes 7–11)

Editorial Board:
I. M. Bespalov (Volumes 2–4)
P. I. Lebedev-Polyansky
Lunacharsky
I. L. Matza (Volumes 2–9)
I. M. Nusinov
V. F. Pereverzev (Volumes 1–3)
I. Skrypnyk (Volumes 1–6)
V. M. Fritzsche (Volumes 1–9)

See also
Soviet Concise Literary Encyclopedia (9 volumes, 1962–1978)

References

External links
 Literary Encyclopedia (Russian)
 Literary Encyclopedia (Russian)

1929 non-fiction books
Encyclopedias of literature
Soviet encyclopedias
Russian-language encyclopedias
20th-century encyclopedias